Petr Nedvěd (born December 9, 1971) is a Czech-born Canadian former professional ice hockey player who spent 15 seasons in the National Hockey League (NHL) between 1990 and 2007.

Early career
Nedvěd was born in Liberec, Czechoslovakia to Jaroslav and Soňa ("Sonia") Nedvěd. He left Czechoslovakia as a refugee on January 2, 1989, at the age of 17 after playing in an international midget tournament in Calgary. Nedvěd was the star of the tournament, with 17 goals and nine assists. He decided to defect to Canada because of the limited opportunities in Czechoslovakia under communist rule, which was very strict regarding athletes leaving the country to pursue professional careers elsewhere. He did not tell his parents about the decision, and with $20 and the help of another Czech who defected, whom Nedvěd refuses to identify even today, he declared his defection at a Calgary police station. In an interview in the Newark Star Ledger, Nedvěd said that the "fear of regret" was the overriding reason to defect. For ten months until the fall of communism in Czechoslovakia in the Velvet Revolution, Nedvěd's parents were forced to make calls imploring Nedvěd to come home.

Nedvěd married supermodel Veronika Vařeková in 2004. In early 2006, when playing for the Phoenix Coyotes, Nedvěd asked for a trade to an Eastern Conference team to be closer to Vařeková who worked primarily in New York City. However, during the summer of 2006, Nedvěd and Vařeková separated. He has since moved back to the Czech Republic. His brother, defenceman Jaroslav Nedvěd, is also an ice hockey player.

Playing career
After his defection, Nedvěd played one season for the Seattle Thunderbirds of the Western Hockey League and was drafted second overall by the Vancouver Canucks in the 1990 NHL Entry Draft after scoring 145 points in 71 games. Expected to be an instant star in the NHL, his first two seasons were a disappointment, as he struggled offensively and earned a reputation for soft play. In 1992–93, he finished with 38 goals and 71 points including a club record 15-game point-scoring streak. Despite this, though, he struggled in the playoffs and earned the ire of Canucks fans when he asked his idol Wayne Gretzky for a game stick immediately following the team's ouster from the playoffs by the Los Angeles Kings, an action fans felt symbolized the lack of commitment to winning from a player who scored just three goals in 28 playoff games as a Canucks player.

Prior to the 1993–94 season, Nedvěd became involved in a bitter contract dispute with the Canucks which resulted in a lengthy holdout. While holding out, Nedvěd obtained his Canadian citizenship, and represented Canada at the 1994 Winter Olympics, winning a silver medal. His situation was finally resolved just before the NHL trade deadline, when he was signed by the St. Louis Blues, with Craig Janney ultimately awarded to the Canucks as compensation (and then dealt back to the Blues shortly after for Jeff Brown, Bret Hedican and Nathan LaFayette). Nedvěd scored 20 points in 19 games, but again struggled in the playoffs as the Blues were swept in the first round.

Nedvěd's stay in St. Louis would prove a short one, as he was dealt to the New York Rangers for the lockout-shortened 1994–95 season. He finished the year with 23 points in 46 games.

For the 1995–96 season, Nedvěd was on the move again, this time dealt to the Pittsburgh Penguins in a blockbuster trade. In Pittsburgh, Nedvěd would have the best years of his career on an offensive team featuring superstars Mario Lemieux, Jaromír Jágr, and Ron Francis. In his first year in Pittsburgh, he recorded career highs of 45 goals and 99 points, and also put his playoff demons behind him by scoring 20 points in helping the Penguins reach the conference finals. Included in that was a monumental goal against the Washington Capitals in a quadruple-overtime thriller, which at 79:15 of overtime was at the time the longest NHL game in 60 years. During the 1996–97 season, he enjoyed another solid year, finishing with 33 goals and 71 points.

However, Nedvěd would find himself in another major contract dispute, and miss the entire 1997–98 season, instead spending most of the year toiling for lower-level teams in the Czech Republic. He remained unsigned at the start of the 1998–99 campaign, instead starting suiting up with the Las Vegas Thunder of the IHL. The situation would finally end two months into the season when he was dealt back to the New York Rangers in a deal involving Alexei Kovalev. The lengthy holdout would turn out to be a colossal blunder for Nedvěd, as he actually ended up with less money (once the millions of dollars he'd given up by missing a season were factored in) than had he accepted Pittsburgh's initial offer back in 1997, while at the same time he ended up missing an extended portion of the prime of his career and severely damaged his reputation around the league.

Nedvěd's second stint in New York would be more successful than the first, and the six seasons he would spend with the Rangers would represent the most stable portion of his career. Although the team would struggle and miss the playoffs every year through this stretch, Nedvěd would be a consistent offensive performer, leading the Rangers in scoring twice and finishing second on another occasion. In 2000–01, playing with Jan Hlaváč and Radek Dvořák – a trio dubbed the 'Czech Mates' – he had the second-best season of his career, finishing with 32 goals and 78 points.

Suffering through a disappointing 2003–04 season, Nedvěd was dealt to the Edmonton Oilers at the trade deadline. Although Edmonton failed to make the playoffs, Nedvěd scored 15 points in 16 games as the team went on a late-season surge.

Nedvěd signed with the Phoenix Coyotes in 2004 and spent the 2004–05 NHL lockout with HC Sparta Praha of the Czech Extraliga. Returning to NHL action in 2005–06 with the Coyotes, he struggled badly, scoring just two goals and 11 points in 25 games. He was dealt to the Philadelphia Flyers, where his play improved somewhat and he scored a further 14 points in 28 games, and returned to the NHL playoffs for the first time since 1997.

The 2006–07 season again started poorly for Nedvěd, and he was placed on waivers on October 18 following a 9–1 loss to the Buffalo Sabres, and was assigned to the American Hockey League (AHL) for the first time in his career. After bouncing between the NHL and AHL for the next two months, Nedvěd was claimed on re-entry waivers by the Edmonton Oilers, who hoped he could provide the same sort of spark he did when acquired in 2004. However, he continued to struggle in Edmonton and finished the season with just two goals and 12 points in 40 games between Edmonton and Philadelphia.

On July 19, 2007, Nedvěd signed a one-year contract to return to HC Sparta Praha.

On July 31, 2008, Nedvěd, attempting to make an NHL comeback, was invited to the New York Rangers training camp on a tryout basis. He was released by the Rangers on September 26 and returned to the Extraliga, this time with his hometown HC Bílí Tygři Liberec.

On May 4, 2012, at age 40, Nedvěd returned to the Czech Republic national team in the 2012 IIHF World Championship hosted in Finland and Sweden.
On May 10, 2012, Nedvěd became the oldest Team Czech Republic player to score a goal in World Championship. He scored game-winning goal against Latvia at the age of 40 years, 6 months and 1 day.

On January 6, 2014, Nedvěd was named to the Czech team for the 2014 Sochi Olympics.  He played in five games as the Czech Republic finished 6th.

On March 13, 2014, Nedvěd played his last career game with Bílí Tygři Liberec in a 6–2 home loss against the HC Vítkovice Steel. He officially announced his retirement after the game.

Awards
 1989–90 – Jim Piggott Memorial Trophy Rookie of the Year (WHL)
 1989–90 – Rookie of the Year (CHL)
 1993–94 – silver medal (1994 Winter Olympics)
 2011–12 – bronze medal (2012 IIHF World Championship)

Legacy
In the 2009 book 100 Ranger Greats, the authors ranked Nedvěd at No. 71 all-time of the 901 New York Rangers who had played during the team's first 82 seasons.

Career statistics

Regular season and playoffs

International

References

External links
 

1971 births
Living people
Canadian expatriate ice hockey players in the Czech Republic
Canadian ice hockey centres
Canadian people of Czech descent
Czechoslovak defectors
Czechoslovak emigrants to Canada
Edmonton Oilers players
HC Bílí Tygři Liberec players
HC Sparta Praha players
Ice hockey players at the 1994 Winter Olympics
Ice hockey players at the 2014 Winter Olympics
Las Vegas Thunder players
Medalists at the 1994 Winter Olympics
National Hockey League first-round draft picks
Naturalized citizens of Canada
New York Rangers players
Olympic ice hockey players of Canada
Olympic ice hockey players of the Czech Republic
Olympic medalists in ice hockey
Olympic silver medalists for Canada
Sportspeople from Liberec
Philadelphia Flyers players
Philadelphia Phantoms players
Phoenix Coyotes players
Pittsburgh Penguins players
Seattle Thunderbirds players
St. Louis Blues players
Vancouver Canucks draft picks
Vancouver Canucks players
Canadian expatriate ice hockey players in the United States
Czechoslovak ice hockey centres
Czech expatriate ice hockey players in the United States